Gaoqiao may refer to the following entities in China:

Towns
Gaoqiao, Sha County, in Anhui
Gaoqiao, Kai County, in Chongqing
Gaoqiao, Zunyi, in Huichuan District, Zunyi, Guizhou
Gaoqiao, Tongzi County, in Guizhou
Gaoqiao, Lianjiang County, in Guangdong
Gaoqiao, Hong'an County, in Hubei
Gaoqiao, Xianning, in Xian'an District, Xianning, Hubei
Gaoqiao Town, Changsha, a town of Changsha County in Hunan.
Gaoqiao, Cili County, in Hunan
Gaoqiao, Xinning, in Xinning County, Hunan
Gaoqiao, Zhenjiang, in Dantu District, Zhenjiang, Jiangsu
Gaoqiao, Huludao, in Lianshan District, Huludao, Liaoning
Gaoqiao, Ziyang County, in Shaanxi
Gaoqiao, Yishui County, in Shandong
Gaoqiao, Shanghai, in Pudong New District, Shanghai
Gaoqiao, Emeishan City, in Sichuan
Gaoqiao, Neijiang, in Dongxing District, Neijiang, Sichuan
Gaoqiao, Wuding County, in Yunnan
Gaoqiao, Fuyang, Zhejiang
Gaoqiao, Ningbo, in Yinzhou District, Ningbo, Zhejiang
Gaoqiao, Tongxiang, in Zhejiang

Subdistricts
 Gaoqiao Subdistrict, Changsha, a subdistrict of Yuhua District, Changsha, Hunan province.
 Gaoqiao, Taizhou, a subdistrict of Huangyan District, Taizhou, Zhejiang province.

Stations 
Gaoqiao Station (高桥站)
Gaoqiao Station (Ningbo), station on the No. 1 Line of the Ningbo Metro, in Zhejiang
Gaoqiao Station (Lianjiang), the station for Lianjiang, Guangdong on the Jingguang Railway
Gaoqiao station (Shanghai Metro), station on Phase II of Line 10 of the Shanghai Metro

zh:高桥